Gymnopilus austrosapineus is a species of mushroom-forming fungus in the family Hymenogastraceae. It is found in Australia.

See also

 List of Gymnopilus species

austrosapineus
Fungi described in 1998
Fungi of Australia